Nandhini is an Indian Blockbuster Tamil- Kannada Bilingual Supernatural fantasy thriller drama series that aired on Sun TV, and the latter in Udaya TV and was produced by Sundar C under Avni Telemedia. It starred Nithya Ram in a dual role, as a title protagonist "Nandini" and "Ganga", Malavika Wales, Adhitri Guruvayurappan in lead roles along with Rahul Ravi and Kushboo Sundar in pivotal roles.

Series Overview

Synopsis

Season 1
The story of the serial starts as a man named, Rathnavel falls in love with a mysterious girl, who is a shapeshifting snake named, Parvathy and they both get married. She gave birth to two twin girls- "Nandini" and "Ganga". Nandini inherited the snake quality and Ganga inherited human quality. In order to save her husband, Parvathy transforms him into a transgender called so that her clans wouldn't kill him and gives Ganga to him. Later rathnavel forgets everything and gives Ganga to the housemaid of the palace, Manickam who doesn't have a children and thinks that Ganga is his daughter and Ganga grows up in the palace. Then rathnavel changes his name to "Seyanayagi" and continues to live for the god Karuppar.

6 years later

Parvathy and Nandhini were living a peaceful life as devotees of Kaatu Amman with Muniappa and his family until when Rajashekar and his group arrives to acquire the "Kala Chakras" for profit. One day Rajashekar and his friends namely Namboothiri, Vichu, Kumar, and Madhavi deceived Parvathy and kills her and Muniappa's family and takes the three kaal chakras. Parvathy asks Nandhini to kill all the murderers and their whole family. Namboodhiri and Madhavi (magicians) locked Nandhini in a puthu in Rajashekar palace where Ganga is there.

14 years later

Arun Rajashekar, son of Rajashekar, falls in love with Janaki, a village girl and marries her. Janaki's friend Kavitha loved Arun too but she dies as she was heartbroken because of Janaki and Arun's marriage. Bhairavi, Kavitha's sister vows to avenge her sister's death. Arun soon went to Malaysia and his wife Janaki was living in his palace .Then after months she got a labour pain and gives birth to a baby. But she was killed by Dharmaraj who wants his daughter to marry Arun. Janaki becomes a spirit to protect her family.

6 years later

Ganga, after grown up to a beautiful, gorgeous girl continues to live for the puthu as she do pujas for the past 14 years without knowing that her own sister is locked there.

Rajashekar wants Ganga to marry Arun, so she agrees to marry him and be a good mother to Devasena, Arun and Janaki's daughter.

On the previous night of Ganga marriage, she did poojha to the puthu and when her blood had fallen on Nandhini she comes out after 20 YEARS and enters into ganga's body to avenge her mother's death. Ganga marries Arun and she starts avenging. She planned to kill Arun and Devasena to show the feeling of death to Rajashekar but fails in that as Janaki spirit saves them. So when Kumar (one of the murderer) comes to the palace, she terrifically kills him and tries to take the kala chakras but it goes missing. In order to escape from without seeing, Nandhini leaves Ganga body and Ganga told the police that she had killed Kumar and went to jail so that Nandhini wouldn't enter into her body. But namboodhiri understood and made Ganga out of jail. Then Ganga knows about what had happened to Nandhini and fights with Rajashekar and asks him to give the kaal chakras but he denies and kills Ganga .But Seyanayagi goes and saves Ganga. So Ganga is under treatment for months.

One Week Later

On One Full Moon Day, Nandhini took girl shape and she looks exactly like Ganga. Meanwhile, Rajashekar asks bhairavi(magician who needs kaal chakras) to transform into Ganga and come to palace.

After which Nandhini kills Namboodhiri  and Vichu and traps Bhairavi and enters into Palace as Ganga to search kaal chakras .

Madhavi comes back from her tapasya and plans to kill Nandhini. But Ganga returns and Rajashekar asks for forgiveness. Soon they come to know that Nandhini looks like Ganga.

After few days Nandhini kills Rajashekar, this made Ganga to misunderstand Nandhini. But Seyanayagi tells the truth that Nandhini and Ganga are his daughters. So they join hands. But fate plays a role that they got fight again and again and soon all the three kaal chakras are taken by Madhavi and she gives life to Namboodhiri. They both traps Nandhini and enters into the temple . But their plan fails as Ganga gives the three kaal chakras to Nandhini .

Nandhini then kills Madhavi and Namboodhiri and she wins. Then Nandhini becomes stone  as she didn't kill the Rajashekar family as said by pathathy. So once again Nandhini and Ganga are separated which leaves Ganga  in tears. Afterwards Ganga is pregnant and the whole family lives peacefully. But the sister bond of Nandhini and Ganga leaves us in tears in the last episode as they are separated and Nandhini-Ganga bond can't be beat up by anyone

25 years later

Season 2 

25 years after Ganga and Arun's death, Janani, the daughter of Ganga and Arun along with Devasena decide to save kalachalras from evil. After Janani's death, Nandini comes back to end the evil Namboothiri and Madhavi forever.

Cast

Main

Supporting 
Season 1
Vijayakumar as Rajashekar – He was the father of Arun. He was one of the murderer who seeks "Kaal Chakra", and killed Parvathy and then killed by Nandhini.
Gayatri Jayaraman as Bhairavi – She was a magician who helped nandhini in finding the kaal chakras.
Vinod  as Namboothiri – A priest, He was one of the murderer who seeks "Kaal Chakra", and killed Parvathy and then killed by Nandhini; Madhavi's brother
Vanishree / Rekha Krishnappa as Madhavi – She was one of the murderer who seeks "Kaal Chakra", and killed Parvathy and then killed by Nandhini.
 Narasimha Raju as Muniappa – Parvathy's henchman, Nandhini's guardian and Gayatri's father, killed by Namboothiri.
 Shreya Anchan as Gayathri/Sandhya – Muniappan and lakshmi's daughter, Nandhini and Ganga's cousin sister who take a revenge against the murderers who killed Parvathy, then killed by Naagananthian
 Vichu Vishwanath as Vichu – He was one of the murderer who seeks "Kaal Chakra", and killed Parvathy and then killed by Nandhini; Rajasekhar's best friend
 K. S. G. Venkatesh as Maanikam – Rajasekhar's henchman, Ganga's adoptive father 
 Vijayalakshmi / Kanya Bharathi as Devi – Annapoorani and Rajasekhar's first younger sister, Arun's aunt; Eshwaran's wife and Ramya's mother 
 Meena Vemuri as Leela – Annapoorani and Rajasekhar's second younger sister, Arun's aunt; Dharmaraj's wife, Moorthy and Maya's mother 
 Sachu as Annapoorani – Rajasekhar's elder sister, Arun's aunt
 Padmini Jagadeesh as Manju, Annapoorani and Rajasekhar's third younger sister, Arun's aunt and Kumar's wife 
 Kavitha as Selva Rani – Rajasekhar's second wife, Arun's step mother 
 Swetha as Malathi – Rajasekhar and Selva Rani's daughter, Arun's younger sister and Moorthy's wife
 Kiran as Moorthy – Leela and Dharmaraj's son, Maya's brother, Arun's cousin, Gayatri's ex-fiancé and Malathi's husband 
 Sri Ganesh as Eshwaran – Devi's husband and Ramya's father
 Keerthi Jai Dhanush as Maya – Leela and Dharmaraj's daughter, Moorthy's Sister and Arun's cousin 
 Bhanuprakash as Kumar – Manju's husband 
 Ramesh Pandit as Dharmaraj – Leela's husband, Moorthy and Maya's father 
 Gracey as Lakshmi – Muniappa's wife and Gayatri's mother
 Deepa Nethran as Raadha – Gayatri / Sandhya's adoptive mother 
 Shabnam as Ramya – Devi and Eshwaran's daughter, Arun's ex-fiancé 
 Shanmugarajan / Mahanadi Shankar as Sathyanarayanan 
 Rani as Mallika 
 Girish as Kumar
 Mohammed Mastan Naga as Naganandiyan
 Ramesh Kannan as Nagavanchiyan
 Rudrachand as Shenbagachezhiyan
 V.S.Jayanthi as Chellamma
 Nanditha Ghosh as Kavitha
 Kousalya Senthamarai as Ranganayaki
 Kalairani as Naachiyaaramma
 Anu Mohan as Neelakanthan 
 Manjula Paritala as Shanthi
 Thameem Ansari as Balaji
 Sivakumar as Dr.Siva
 Swarna Ramakrishnan as Meenakshi
 Ram Rajesh as an Icchadhari Snake
 Vijaya Durga as Chamundi
 Baba Lakshman as Janaki's Father (Killed by Bhairavi)

Season 2

Main
 Nithya Ram / Chaya Singh in a dual role as  
 as Nandini
 as Janani (Deceased)
 Kaavya Shastry / Anu Ponnappa as Devasena 
 Rajesh Dhruva / Vinay Gowda as Viraat – Janani's widower and Nandini's husband

Supporting
 Rekha Krishnappa as Madhavi (Main Antagonist)
 Kaavya Shastry as Trishala
 Kavitha as Selva Rani – Rajasekhar's second wife, Arun's step mother, Devasena and Janani's grandmother
 Rashmi as Neeli (Antagonist)
 Bharath as Ashtavakra
 Jayashree S Raj as Sharabha

Special appearances
Season 1
 Yuvina Parthavi as young Gayatri 
 Manjula Vijayakumar as Manjula – Rajasekhar's first wife and Arun's mother (posthumous photographic appearance only)
 Singampuli as himself
 Vaiyapuri as himself
 Sudha Raghunathan as herself

Season 2
 Ramesh Aravind as himself

Reception
The first season of the show was a huge hit in all languages. In week 42 of 2017 and the following week, it was at first position. In week 52 of 2018, it was at first position with 15.47 million impressions.

Spin Off 
 

Jothi was a 2021 Indian Supernatural fantasy thriller Tamil language television series, which aired on Sun TV on 29 May 2021 in every weekends. It was produced by Sundar C under the studio of Avni Telemedia. It starred Meghashree portrayed the titular role, along with Chandhana Shetty and Vishnu Unnikrishnan in the lead roles. This show was a sequel of "Nandini".

Dubbed Versions

References

External links 
 

Sun TV original programming
Tamil-language fantasy television series
Tamil-language horror fiction television series
Tamil-language romance television series
2017 Tamil-language television series debuts
Tamil-language television shows
Television shows set in Malaysia
2018 Tamil-language television series endings
Television series about snakes
Television series about shapeshifting